The National Democratic Party, later renamed National Radical Party, was a political party in Greece in the 1920s led by Georgios Kondylis.

History
The party first contested national elections in 1928, when they won nine seats in the parliamentary elections with 2.7% of the national vote.

The party, changed its name in National Radical Party, contested national elections in 1932, winning five seats in the Vouli with 4.1% of the vote. In the elections the following year the party won eleven seats, becoming the fourth-largest faction in the Hellenic Parliament.

For the 1935 elections the party allied with the People's Party. Due to a boycott by the Venizelist parties, the alliance won 287 of the 300 seats, of which the National Radical Party took 32. For the 1936 elections the party joined the General Popular Radical Union alongside the National People's Party and the Independent People's Party, together winning 60 seats.

References

Defunct political parties in Greece
Second Hellenic Republic
Radical parties